Split Oak Forest is an area of wilderness conservation lands east of Orlando in Osceola County, Florida. A parkway extension project across the southern portion is proposed to provide vehicular access an area of new development.

The wilderness area includes prairie and scrub habitat including sandhill terrain and is home to gopher tortoises, sandhill cranes, eastern indigo snakes, fox squirrels, butterflies, woodpeckers, kestrels, various songbirds, and some rare plant species. There are trails throughout the Park for visitors.

A Friends of Split Oak Forest group formed to try to protect the area from the intrusion of the road. A conservation land swap is proposed to mitigate impact from the road and this plan has received support from county commissioners and Charles Lee of the Florida Audubon Society. The Orlando Sentinel editorial board supports the road project with planned mitigation.

A proposed Osceola Parkway extension is planned through the southern part of the preserve. The road project is one of many including extensive new toll roads being proposed through largely undeveloped areas engendering controversy during Governor Ron DeSantis' tenure.

References

Conservation areas of the United States
Protected areas of Osceola County, Florida